Erie Air Park  is a privately-owned public use ultralight airport located one nautical mile (1.85 km) north of the central business district of Erie, a village in Whiteside County, Illinois, United States.

Facilities and aircraft 
It has one runway designated 18U/36U with a turf surface measuring 2,000 by 200 feet (610 x 61 m).

For the 12-month period ending August 31, 2019, the airport averaged 115 aircraft operations per week, or roughly 6,000 per year, consisting completely of general aviation. At that time there were 27 single-engine airplanes based at this airport.

The airport has over two dozen hangars and sees significant local and transient traffic.

References

External links 
 Aerial photo as of 5 April 1998 from USGS The National Map

Airports in Illinois
Buildings and structures in Whiteside County, Illinois
Ultralight aviation